Velandipalayam is an suburban area located in Coimbatore city of Tamil Nadu state of India. This locality is present near Sai Baba colony and is mostly occupied by middle-class people living in Coimbatore. One side is bordered by Thadagam road and the other side by Vadavalli. It is a Resedential area. More apartments are found in this area.

Education

Schools
Avila Convent
Bharathi Matriculation Hr.sec.school
Liseux
Vishvaa Academy
Vishvaa Academy

Politics
Velandipalayam comes under Coimbatore-North taluk. It belongs to Coimbatore North constituency. At present ADMK is ruling.

Transport

Air
The area is served by the Coimbatore International Airport at nearby Peelamedu.

Rail
The main station is Coimbatore Junction. The nearest railway station is Coimbatore North Junction.

Road
Velandipalayam is situated in Thadagam road. SH 164 passes through Velandipalayam which connects with Anaikatti.

References

Neighbourhoods in Coimbatore